NZGS may refer to:

 New Zealand Gallantry Star, military decoration of the New Zealand armed forces
 New Zealand Geographical Society, part of the Royal Society of New Zealand
 New Zealand Geological Survey, government science agency
 New Zealand Go Society, national governing body for the board game
 Gisborne Airport (ICAO code), North Island of New Zealand
 New Zealand Geotechnical Society, a technical society affiliated to Engineering New Zealand